Rashid Khan Arman (born 20 September 1998) is an Afghan international cricketer and captain of the Afghanistan national team in T20I format. In franchise leagues, he plays for Gujarat Titans in the Indian Premier League (IPL), Adelaide Strikers in Australia's Big Bash League (BBL), Lahore Qalandars in the Pakistan Super League (PSL), and Band-e-Amir Dragons in Afghanistan's Shpageeza Cricket League. He bowls right-arm leg spin and bats right-handed.

He was one of the eleven cricketers to play in Afghanistan's first ever Test match, against India, in June 2018. He returned the most expensive bowling figures by a debutant in a nation's maiden Test match. In September 2019, he led the team in the one-off Test against Bangladesh, and at the age of 20 years and 350 days, became the youngest cricketer to captain a Test match side.

In June 2017, he took the best bowling figures for an associate nation in a One Day International (ODI) match. In February 2018, he became the youngest player to top the ICC Player Rankings for bowlers in ODIs. Later the same month, he also topped the ICC Player Rankings for bowlers in T20Is. In September 2018, he became the number one player in the ICC's all-rounder rankings, following his performance at the 2018 Asia Cup.

In March 2018, during the 2018 Cricket World Cup Qualifier, he captained Afghanistan for the first time in an ODI match. At the age of 19 years and 165 days, he became the youngest player to captain an international side. In the final of the Cricket World Cup Qualifier, against the West Indies, Khan became the fastest and youngest bowler to take 100 wickets in ODIs when he dismissed Shai Hope. He took 44 matches to take his 100th dismissal, breaking the previous record of 52 matches, set by Mitchell Starc of Australia. In June 2018, he became the fastest bowler, in terms of time, to take 50 wickets in T20Is. He reached the milestone in two years and 220 days, in the first T20I against Bangladesh. In October 2021, he also became the fastest bowler, in terms of matches, to take 100 wickets in T20I cricket, in his 53rd match.

In April 2019, the Afghanistan Cricket Board (ACB) named Khan as the team's new T20I captain, replacing Asghar Afghan. Khan was also appointed as the vice-captain of the ODI squad. In June 2019, during the 2019 Cricket World Cup, Khan played in his 100th international cricket match for Afghanistan. Following the World Cup, Khan was appointed as captain of the Afghanistan cricket team across all formats. However, in December 2019, the ACB reappointed Asghar Afghan as the captain of the Afghanistan cricket team across all formats. In December 2020, Khan was named the ICC Men's T20I Player of the Decade.

By becoming a successful professional cricketer from a nation with no previous cricketing infrastructure, Khan created a path for others to do likewise, such as countrymen Mohammad Nabi and Mujeeb Ur Rahman, and Nepal's Sandeep Lamichhane.

Early life
Rashid Khan was born in 1998 in Nangarhar, Eastern Afghanistan. He hails from Jalalabad, and has ten siblings. When he was still young, his family fled the Afghan war and lived in Pakistan for "a few years". They later returned to Afghanistan, resuming their normal life with Rashid continuing his schooling. Rashid grew up playing cricket with his brothers and idolised Pakistani all-rounder Shahid Afridi, from whom he stylised his bowling action.

International career
He made his One Day International (ODI) debut for Afghanistan against Zimbabwe on 18 October 2015. He made his Twenty20 International (T20I) debut, also against Zimbabwe, on 26 October.

On 10 March 2017, Khan took his maiden T20I five-wicket haul at the second T20I against Ireland. His figures of five wickets for three runs is the best bowling performance by an Afghan cricket in a T20I and the joint fourth-best figures in all T20Is. He became the first player to take a five-wicket haul in two overs in a T20I match. Afghanistan won the match and Rashid and Najeeb Tarakai shared the man of the match award.

In the ODI series against Ireland, along with Paul Stirling, they became the first pair of bowlers from different teams to each take six wickets in the same ODI.

On 9 June, he took his second ODI five-wicket haul, finishing with figures of 7 wickets for 18 runs against the West Indies at Gros Islet. It was the fourth best ODI bowling figures and first by an associate nation cricketer to take 7 wickets. Afghanistan defended its total of 212 runs and won the match by 63 runs, and Khan was adjudged man of the match.

In January 2018, the International Cricket Council (ICC) named him as the Associate Cricketer of the Year. The following month, he was named as the stand-in captain of the Afghanistan team for the 2018 Cricket World Cup Qualifier tournament, while Afghanistan's regular captain, Asghar Stanikzai, recovered from having his appendix removed. In February 2018, the ICC named Khan as one of the ten players to watch ahead of the 2018 Cricket World Cup Qualifier tournament.

In April 2018, he was named in the Rest of the World XI squad for the one-off T20I against the West Indies, which was played at Lord's on 31 May 2018. In February 2019, in the third T20I match against Ireland, he took a hat-trick and four wickets with four balls.

Test cricket
In May 2018, he was named in Afghanistan's squad for their inaugural Test match, played against India. He made his Test debut for Afghanistan, against India, on 14 June 2018. On his Test debut he conceded 154 runs in the first innings of the match, becoming the first bowler to concede more than 150 runs in their inaugural Test appearance of any player's country. Rashid's figures of 2 for 154 in the first innings was also the highest number of runs conceded by a bowler in country's inaugural Test match, beating the previous record held by Amir Elahi, who conceded 134 runs during Pakistan's debut Test against India in 1952. During the Afghanistan's inaugural test match he along with Wafadar set a new record for becoming the first pair of teenagers to concede more than 100 runs each in nation's inaugural Test match.

In February 2019, he was named in Afghanistan's Test squad for their one-off match against Ireland in India. In the second innings, he took five wickets for 82 runs, becoming the first bowler for Afghanistan to take a five-wicket haul in a Test match.

2019 Cricket World Cup
In April 2019, he was named in Afghanistan's squad for the 2019 Cricket World Cup. The International Cricket Council (ICC) named him as one of the five exciting talents making their Cricket World Cup debut. On 1 June 2019, in Afghanistan's opening match against Australia, Khan played in his 100th international cricket match. This included one game with a World XI side in the Hurricane Relief T20 Challenge in May 2018. Three days later, against Sri Lanka, Khan played in his 100th international match for Afghanistan. On 18 June 2019, in the match against England, Rashid bowled the most expensive spell in a Cricket World Cup match, conceding 110 runs from his nine overs.

Captaincy and the T20I Cricket World Cup
Following the 2019 Cricket World Cup, Rashid was appointed as captain of the Afghanistan cricket team across all three formats. His first Test match as captain was against Bangladesh in September 2019. Afghanistan won the match by 224 runs. Rashid Khan became the first bowler for Afghanistan to take a ten-wicket haul in Tests, and was the first cricketer to score a fifty and take a ten-wicket haul in his debut match as captain in a Test match. In December 2019, the Afghanistan Cricket Board reappointed Asghar Afghan as the national captain across all three formats.

In November 2020, Khan was nominated for the ICC Men's T20I Cricketer of the Decade award, winning the accolade the following month. In July 2021, Khan was again named the captain of Afghanistan's T20I team. In September 2021, Khan was named the captain of Afghanistan's squad for the 2021 ICC Men's T20 World Cup. However, after the squad was named, Khan stepped down as the team's captain, stating that the selection committee had not gained his consent for the team. On 7 November 2021, in Afghanistan's T20 World Cup match against New Zealand, Khan took his 400th wicket in Twenty20 cricket.

In December 2022, Rashid was once again appointed as captain of Afghanistan in T20I format, after Mohammad Nabi resigned from captaincy following the 2022 ICC Men's T20 World Cup.

Domestic and T20 franchise career 
On 7 December 2016 he made his first-class debut, for Afghanistan against the England Lions in Abu Dhabi, taking 4 for 48 and 8 for 74, and scoring 25 not out and 52.

Indian Premier League
He was also amongst the two first ever Afghan players to be selected for the IPL.

He made his IPL debut in the opening fixture of the 2017 tournament, taking two wickets, as the Sunrisers Hyderabad won the match by 35 runs. He finished the tournament as the sixth-highest wicket-taker with 17 wickets from 14 matches.

On 5 May 2018, during the 2018 Indian Premier League, Khan played in his 100th Twenty20 match. He took two wickets, affected a run out, and was named the man of the match. In March 2022, he played as the vice-captain for the Gujarat Titans in IPL 2022.

Caribbean Premier League
A month after getting selected in the IPL, he was bought by Guyana Amazon Warriors for $60,000 to play in the 2017 Caribbean Premier League (CPL). In September 2017, he took a hat-trick for Guyana Amazon Warriors, the first hat-trick in the history of the CPL.

In July 2020, he was named in the Barbados Tridents squad for the 2020 Caribbean Premier League. On 20 August 2020, in the match against the St Lucia Zouks, Khan took his 300th wicket in Twenty20 cricket. At the age of 21 years and 335 days, became the youngest bowler to take 300 wickets in T20 cricket. He also became the fastest to take 300 wickets in the format, doing so in 213 matches.

Big Bash League
In September 2017, he signed with Adelaide Strikers to play in the 2017–18 Big Bash League, he later went on to win the tournament. On 8 January 2020, in a match during BBL09 against the Sydney Sixers, Rashid took the fifth hat-trick in the history of the BBL. Since joining the Strikers, he has cemented himself as a fan's favourite in Adelaide.

On 12 January 2022, in the 2021–22 Big Bash League season, Khan played in his 300th Twenty20 match. In the game he took six wickets for 17 runs, his career-best figures, and the third-best figures in the BBL.

Afghanistan Premier League
In September 2018, he was named as the Icon Player for Kabul Zwanan's squad in the first edition of the Afghanistan Premier League tournament. Despite being on the losing side in the final, he was named as the player of the tournament.

Pakistan Super League
In November 2017, he was selected to play for the Quetta Gladiators in 2018 Pakistan Super League players draft.

In October 2018, the Pakistan Super League (PSL) drafts revealed that Rashid Khan was included in the 14-men Platinum Category. For the 2021 edition of Pakistan Super League, he was named as the first Platinum Pick for the Lahore Qalandars and played his first match against Peshawar Zalmi.

Other tournaments
In October 2017, he was signed by Sussex County Cricket Club to play in the NatWest T20 Blast in England. During the first-ever player draft for The Hundred, Rashid was the first pick for the Trent Rockets, in the top price band (£125,000). In October 2018, he was named in Durban Heat's squad for the first edition of the Mzansi Super League T20 tournament. In July 2019, he was selected to play for the Rotterdam Rhinos in the inaugural edition of the Euro T20 Slam cricket tournament. However, the following month the tournament was cancelled. In December 2021, Khan was again signed by Sussex for the 2022 T20 Blast tournament in England. In April 2022, he was bought by the Trent Rockets for the 2022 season of The Hundred.

Honours

 Indian Premier League champion 2022

References

External links

 

1998 births
Living people
Afghan cricketers
Afghan expatriates in Pakistan
Afghanistan Test cricketers
Afghanistan One Day International cricketers
Afghanistan Twenty20 International cricketers
People from Nangarhar Province
Pashtun people
Comilla Victorians cricketers
Sunrisers Hyderabad cricketers
Quetta Gladiators cricketers
Guyana Amazon Warriors cricketers
World XI Twenty20 International cricketers
Kabul Zwanan cricketers
Durban Heat cricketers
Adelaide Strikers cricketers
Cricketers at the 2019 Cricket World Cup
Twenty20 International hat-trick takers
Afghan refugees
Afghan cricket captains
Lahore Qalandars cricketers
Trent Rockets cricketers
Sussex cricketers
Gujarat Titans cricketers